Yoni Bloch (born August 11, 1981) is an Israeli musician, songwriter, composer, rock singer and hi-tech entrepreneur.

Biography 

Bloch grew up in Beersheba and at the age of 17 moved with his family to Lehavim.  He started taking piano lessons when he was 6 years old, taught himself to play the guitar and the drums, and at 14 started to write songs and to compose music. He also learned how to write computer programs at an early age on a Commodore 64, a skill he'd later use with his bandmates when they created the technology for the interactive media startup and technology startup Eko.

His artistic journey started on the website Bama Hadasha ("New Stage"), which allows aspiring artists to publish their work in the fields of prose, poetry, plastic arts, music, etc. The daughter of the chairman of the record company NMC heard Bloch's songs on the site and introduced his music to her father. In a short while, Bloch's songs were heard in the radio. Today, he is a musician and tech founder, and his songs receive major airtime in Israel.

Music career
His first album Ulay Ze Ani ("Maybe It's Me") was released in 2004. Most of the songs were published earlier in the website Bama Hadasha. The musical style of the album is melodic rock, and the songs moved from rhythmical songs to calm and quiet ones.  The songs were written in a humorous ambiance, which was expressed either in the lyrics or in the melody. Most of the songs were written by Barak Feldman and composed by Bloch.

Bloch also wrote songs for TV shows, TV realities and plays.

In June 2007 Bloch released his second album Hergelim Ra'im ("Bad Habits"). Also in this album there's his cover to the ballad "Annabel-Lee" written by Edgar Allan Poe, and was translated to Hebrew by Ze'ev Jabotinsky.

Bloch was a guest judge on the 5th season of the Israeli version of American Idol - "Kochav Nolad".

On November 19, 2008 Bloch released his third album Al Mi Ani Oved ("Who am I fooling"), and attached to it a movie that is made of clips to all the songs of the album. In the movie Bloch dies from a broken heart. The album was written after a hard break up of Bloch and his unknown girlfriend, in most of the songs at first there's a tranquil atmosphere and towards the end it becomes a rock song.

Business career
Bloch is the founder and CEO of Interlude, d.b.a. Eko, a technology startup developing interactive video technology that turns passive, linear videos into user-directed, multi-path stories. Eko also launched Eko Studio (fka Treehouse), a platform for independent creators to create and distribute their own interactive videos. Interlude is based in New York, Los Angeles and Tel Aviv, and is backed by Sequoia Capital, Intel Capital, New Enterprise Associates, MGM, Sony, Samsung, WMG, WPP, and Innovation Endeavors.

Discography 
 Ulay Ze Ani, 'אולי זה אני' ( "Maybe It's Me" ) (2004)
- The album contains the single "Makir Oto", 'מכיר אותו' ("Know Him") among others.
 Hergelim Ra'im, 'הרגלים רעים' ( "Bad Habits" ) (2007)
- The album contains the singles "Achraiut", 'אחריות' ("Responsibility"), "Nof Acher", 'נוף אחר' ("Different View"), "Siba La'azov", 'סיבה לעזוב' ("Reason to Leave") and the title track.
 Al Mi Ani Oved, 'על מי אני עובד' ( "Who Am I Fooling?" ) (2008)
- The album contains the singles "Ahava Rechoka", 'אהבה רחוקה' ("Distant Love") and "Hakin'a" ("Jealousy").

See also
Music in Israel
Eko (media production company)

References

External links
Eko

1981 births
Living people
Israeli Jews
21st-century Israeli male singers
Place of birth missing (living people)
Musicians from Beersheba
Israeli company founders
Businesspeople from Beersheba